Lophoziaceae is a family of liverworts belonging to the order Jungermanniales.

Included genera:
Andrewsianthus R.M.Schust.
Gerhildiella Grolle
Heterogemma (Jørg.) Konstant. & Vilnet
Lophozia (Dumort.) Dumort.
Lophoziopsis Konstant. & Vilnet 
Pseudocephaloziella R.M.Schust.
Trilophozia (R.M.Schust.) Bakalin
Tritomaria Schiffn. ex Loeske

References

Jungermanniales
Liverwort families